Peter Dow (11 October 1939 – 20 January 2008) was an  Australian rules footballer who played with North Melbourne in the Victorian Football League (VFL).

Peter Dow had two grandsons play AFL football with Paddy Dow at Carlton and Thomson Dow at Richmond.

Notes

External links 

1939 births		
2008 deaths
Australian rules footballers from Victoria (Australia)
North Melbourne Football Club players